Paul Anthony Hoolihan (born 8 May 1947) is an Australian politician who represented the seat of Keppel in the Legislative Assembly of Queensland as a member of the Labor Party from 2004 to 2012.

References

1947 births
Living people
Members of the Queensland Legislative Assembly
Australian Labor Party members of the Parliament of Queensland
21st-century Australian politicians